The 1948–49 season was the Tri-Cities Blackhawks' third season of play and the last of the National Basketball League (NBL) before its merger with the Basketball Association of America (BAA). Led by league MVP Don Otten, the Blackhawks experienced the first winning season in team history.

Roster

 Head Coach: Bobby McDermott

Regular season

Western Division standings

Playoffs
Won Opening Round (Sheboygan Red Skins) 2–0Lost Division Semifinals (Oshkosh All-Stars) 1–3

Awards and records
Don Otten – MVP, All-NBL First Team
Whitey Von Nieda – All-NBL Second Team
Hoot Gibson – All-NBL Second Team

References

Atlanta Hawks seasons
Tri-Cities